Kirbyina Nasie Alexander (born 6 July 1987) is a Trinidadian cricketer who plays as a right-arm pace bowler. She appeared in 20 One Day Internationals and 6 Twenty20 Internationals for West Indies between 2005 and 2010. She plays domestic cricket for Trinidad and Tobago.

References

External links

1987 births
Living people
West Indian women cricketers
West Indies women One Day International cricketers
West Indies women Twenty20 International cricketers
Trinidad and Tobago women cricketers